Lucan is a TV drama starring Kevin Brophy that aired on ABC from 1977 to 1978.  The series was based on an earlier May 22, 1977, made-for-TV movie  of the same name directed by David Greene starring John Randolph and Kevin Brophy, along with Stockard Channing, Ned Beatty and Lou Frizzell.

Synopsis
A 20-year-old man (Brophy) who spent the first 10 years of his life running wild in the forests of northern Minnesota, after being raised by wolves, Lucan is taken to a research institute and taught the ways of human society. He is befriended by a kind researcher, Doctor Hoagland (John Randolph), with whom he bonded during his journey to civilization.  Lucan's continued freedom at the research center is put in peril once his doctor friend and mentor is hurt.

Unable to ensure Lucan's well-being at the institute, his friend encourages him to strike out on his own in search of his identity and family. The series chronicled the encounters, challenges, and intrigues Lucan faced interacting with people using his new learned social graces and old Wolfen instincts. He is also pursued by a bounty hunter, Prentiss (Don Gordon), who is hired by the university to bring him back. (The last four episodes of the series altered the premise to reveal that Lucan was actually on the run from the police for a crime he didn't commit. Prentiss was made a police lieutenant charged with bringing Lucan in for trial for a murder case.)

As well as being unusually strong and agile, Lucan also possessed special Wolfen skills that appeared in emergency situations. When upset to the point of violence, his eyes glowed amber. He also had heightened senses of smell and hearing. In a few episodes, he was able to call on his old wolf family/pack for help.

Episodes

Season 1: 1977

Season 2: 1978

Merchandise
A novel based on the pilot TV-movie was released as well as a board game based on the show.

DVD release
On April 3, 2018, Warner Bros. released Lucan- The Complete Series on DVD via their Warner Archive Collection.  This is a manufacture-on-demand (MOD) release, available through Warner's online store.

References

External links

Lucan Fansite

1977 American television series debuts
1978 American television series endings
1970s American drama television series
American Broadcasting Company original programming
Television series by MGM Television
Television shows set in Philadelphia